Sultan Al-Yami  [سلطان اليامي in Arabic] (born 2 June 1987) is a Saudi football player who plays for Al-Jubail as a right back.

References
 

1987 births
Living people
Saudi Arabian footballers
Al-Qadsiah FC players
Al-Taawoun FC players
Al-Faisaly FC players
Al-Orobah FC players
Al-Shoulla FC players
Al-Raed FC players
Al-Nahda Club (Saudi Arabia) players
Najran SC players
Al-Thoqbah Club players
Al-Jubail Club players
People from Najran
Saudi First Division League players
Saudi Professional League players
Saudi Third Division players
Association football fullbacks